Beit Ijza (also spelled Bayt Ijza); is a village in the Jerusalem Governorate in the central West Bank with an area of 2,526 dunams. Located approximately six miles north of Jerusalem, it had a population of 698 in 2007.

Location

History

Ottoman era 
Beit Ijza  was incorporated into the Ottoman Empire in 1517 with all of Palestine, and in 1596 it appeared in the tax registers as being in the nahiya of Al-Quds in the liwa of Al-Quds under the name of Bayt Iza. It had a population of 6 household; who were all Muslims. They paid a fixed Ziamet tax-rate of 33.3% on agricultural products, including wheat, barley, summer crops, olive trees, vineyards, fruit trees, goats and beehives, in addition to occasional revenues; a total of 2,500 akçe.

In 1738 Richard Pococke named it Beteser, seeing it "on the hill to the east of the valley".

In 1838, it was described as a Muslim  village, located in the Beni Malik area, west of Jerusalem.

In 1883 the PEF's Survey of Western Palestine (SWP) described Beit Izza as: "a village of moderate size on a hill with a spring at some distance to the west."

British Mandate era
In the 1922 census of Palestine conducted by the British Mandate authorities, "Bait Izza" had a population of 59 Muslims, decreasing slightly in the 1931 census to 54 Muslims, in 14 houses.

In the 1945 statistics Beit Ijza had a population of  70 Muslims, with a total of 2,550 dunams of land, according to an official land and population survey. Of this, Arabs used 122 dunams for plantations and irrigable land, 922 for cereals, while 8 dunams were built-up (urban) land.

Jordanian era
In the wake of the 1948 Arab–Israeli War, and after the 1949 Armistice Agreements, Beit Ijza came  under Jordanian rule.

The Jordanian census of 1961 found 129 inhabitants in Beit Ijza.

Post 1967
Since the Six-Day War in 1967, Beit Ijza has been under Israeli occupation.

Under the 1995 Oslo II Accord, 6.7% of the total village area was classified as Area B, and the remaining 93.3% classified as Area C, under full Israeli control. Israel has confiscated land in Beit Ijza for settlements, including Giv'at Ze'ev and Giv'on Ha'hadasha. In addition, the separation wall extends onto Beit Ijza land, leaving 980 dunums, (or 38.1% of the total village's area), behind the wall, on the Israeli side. The Palestinian owners of the land must rely on Israeli permission to access their land. Permission is only granted to the property owner, often elderly people, leaving them unable to hire help to work the land. One family in Beit Ijza lives with walls on all sides of its property due to extensive land expropriations by Israel.

Shrine
Tawfiq Canaan found a Maqam (shrine) for en-nabi Yusif, on a spot which dominated Beit Ijza.

References

Bibliography

 
 

 
 
  

 

   (pp.      17 - 18: this shows Beit Ijza, according to Pringle, 2009,  p.   234) 
 (p. 234)

External links
Welcome to Bayt Ijza
Survey of Western Palestine, Map 17:  IAA, Wikimedia commons 
 Bayt Ijza village (fact sheet),  Applied Research Institute–Jerusalem (ARIJ)
  Beit Ijza village profile, ARIJ
 Beit Ijza  aerial photo, ARIJ
Locality Development Priorities and Needs in Beit Ijza, ARIJ
POICA

Villages in the West Bank
Jerusalem Governorate